Christoph Sattler is a prolific German architect who has been professionally active since the early 1970s. Most of his more prominent buildings are in southern Germany or Berlin. Although he is known for a number of large high-profile residential developments, he has also attracted widespread critical and public attention with public buildings and structures such as the Seeparkturm (tower in a park) in Freiburg, the Kupferstichkabinett ('museum of graphic art) in Berlin, various underground stations such as those of Am Hart (Munich) and Mendelssohn-Bartholdy-Park (Berlin) and several art galleries including the controversial Gemäldegalerie in Berlin. He studied for several years during the 1960s in North America as a post-graduate student. During that period he was employed with the firm of Ludwig Mies van der Rohe.

Christoph Sattler is the son of one German architect and the grandson of another.

Life
Christoph Sattler was born in Munich which was administered as part of the US occupation zone after 1945. In cultural, social and political terms Bavaria (of which Munich is the capital) was heavily influenced by the United States during the so-called Wirtschaftswunder years through which he grew up.  He was born into a prosperous family that had come through the twelve Nazi years unburdened by Nazi political connections, in the judgment of the military occupiers. Christoph Sattler was a Godchild of the high-profile priest-intellectual, Romano Guardini, and was indeed christened with "Romano" as his middle name, in celebration of that connection.

In 1952 he was enrolled at the German school in Rome. (His father, having switched careers, had recently accepted a senior diplomatic posting to the newly re-established West German embassy in the city.)   In 1957 he enrolled at the Technical University of Munich:  here he studied Architecture with a number of eminent teachers, including Johannes Ludwig, Josef Wiedemann and Franz Hart.   He obtained practical experience with the architects Rudolf Schwarz (1960) and Peter C. von Seidlein.

Sattler moved to Chicago in 1963 where he studied at the Illinois Institute of Technology. Between 1963 and 1965 he was taught by Myron Goldsmith and Ludwig Hilberseimer, also working during 1964 for Ludwig Mies van der Rohe.   Afrter receiving his  Master of Science (M. Sc.) degree in 1965 he returned to West Germany where between 1966 and 1973 he worked in the planning department of Neue Heimat (NH), a Hamburg-based non-profit housing and construction enterprise belonging to the German Trade Union Confederation.

In 1974 Christoph Sattler teamed up with Heinz Hilmer to establish the Munich-based firm Hilmer & Sattler (as the firm was initially known).

Membership 
Christoph Sattler is a member of the Association of German Architects

Portfolio (selection) 
 1969 (ongoing): Rehabilitation of the medieval old city Karlsruhe
 1971–1972: Habermas House (domestic home), Starnberg
 1981: Wohnhaus Hans Herter House (domestic home), München
 1979–1982: Residential development "documenta urbana" (conceptualising, planning and design), Kassel
 1986: Seeparkturm (park tower), Freiburg im Breisgau
 1988: Städtebaulicher Rahmenplan für Pforzheim
 1990–1993: Studentenwohnheim Freiwasser, Eichstätt
 1991: städtebauliche Gesamtplanung des Potsdamer und Leipziger Platzes
 1993: U-Bahnhof Am Hart, Munich
 1994: Kupferstichkabinett Berlin (Museum of Prints and Drawings)
 1995–1997: Modernisation Schloss Elmau
 1995–2006: Train station Potsdamer Platz
 1998: U-Bahnhof Mendelssohn-Bartholdy-Park, Berlin
 1998: Berliner Gemäldegalerie (picture gallery)
 1998–2000: Martin Gropius Building renovation, Kreuzberg
 1999–2002: City library and music school, Pforzheim
 1999–2003: Zweiter Bauabschnitt der „Fünf Höfe“, München (Bauteil Salvatorstraße)
 2000–2003: Hotel Ritz-Carlton (Potsdamer Platz), Berlin
 2001–2003 & 2005: New Globe House for the Globe of Gottorf at Gottorf Castle Park
 2005–2007: The Charles Hotel, Munich
 2009: Congress center Hotel Einstein, St. Gallen
 2009: Beisheim Center, Berlin
 completed 2010: Masterplan for Museumsinsel, Berlin, jointly with Oswald Mathias Ungers and David Chipperfield
 completed 2012: Restoration Altes Museum, Berlin
 since 2009: "Airtown" urban development plan for Berlin Brandenburg Airport
 2008–2014: Nordbebauung der North Development of the Headquarters of the Federal Intelligence Site, Berlin (jointly with Henn GmbH (architects)
 2017: Wiederaufbau Museum Barberini, Potsdam
 2017–2018: MO82, Munich

Prizes (selection) 
 1977: Association of German Architects' (Bavaria) prize for the Habermas House, Starnberg
 1981: Association of German Architects (Bavaria) prize for the Wohnhaus Hans Herter House, Munich
 2003: Architecture Prize of the Bavarian capital, Munich

Notes

References

People from Munich
Technical University of Munich alumni
Illinois Institute of Technology alumni
Architects from Munich
Modernist architects from Germany
20th-century German architects

Year of birth missing
Year of death missing